Saku Brewery is an Estonian brewery and soft drinks company based in Saku. It was founded in 1820 by the local Baltic German landlord Graf . Since 2008 Carlsberg Group has been the sole owner of Saku Brewery.

History

The history of Saku Brewery begins in early 19th century, when the owner of Saku estate at that time,  – a nobleman of Baltic German descent – decided to build a distillery and a brewery on his land. The brewery was first documented in October 1820. It is believed that the production of beer, for the purpose of sale to pubs and taverns, began in the autumn of that year. From the end of 19th century onward, Saku has remained among the leading breweries in Estonia.

Currently

In 1991, joint venture Saku Õlletehas was established. Since January 27, 1998, the shares of Saku Brewery were traded in the list on the Tallinn Stock Exchange. On 20 September 2008, the shares of Saku Õlletehase AS were delisted from Tallinn Stock Exchange.

Through large investments, Saku Brewery has become the market leader on the Estonian beer market. According to market research by Nielsen Corporation in March 2009, Saku Brewery held 38.7% of the local market share. The total sales of beer by Saku amounted to 59 million litres in 2007.

Beverages of Saku Brewery are exported amongst other countries to Sweden (the only Estonian beer in the Systembolaget is Saku Kuld), Finland, Netherlands, England, Germany, Ireland and Canada. Saku's exports during the first five months of 2009 amounted to 3.12 million litres.

The interests of Estonia's three largest breweries are represented by the Estonian Beer Brewers Association: Saku Brewery, A. Le Coq Brewery and Viru Brewery. The sales turnover of Saku Brewery in 2021 was 69.35 million and the net profit was 8.1 million euros.

Products

Saku Originaal is the flagship product of Saku Brewery and is made of yeast, water and selected malt and hops. Brewing of Saku Originaal started in 1993, making it the first Estonian beer to be sold after Estonia regained its independence. According to market research conducted by Emor in 2002, Saku Originaal is the most recognised and popular Estonian beer.

In April 2009, Saku Brewery invested over 70 million kroons into a new crystal-filtering technology, the first brewery to employ this technology in Estonia. Saku Originaal was the first beer to be brewed using this technology. Crystal-filtering helps remove bacteria from the beer during brewing, giving the beer a longer lifetime and stronger taste.

Besides beers, Saku Brewery also produces mineral water (Vichy), cider, long drinks (Saku GN), and energy drinks (Battery, Super Manki).

Beers
Saku Originaal, Saku Kuld, Rock, Karl Friedrich, Saku Hele, Saku Tume, Saku Pilsner, Saku Porter, Saku Antvärk, Saku On Ice, Saku Dublin, Saku Manchester, Taurus, Presidendi 8

Ciders
 Somersby (Apple, Pear, Blackberry, Citrus Fruit, Apple 0.0%)
 Saku Antvärk Pilvine õun, Mesine pirn

Long drinks
 GN Long Drink (Grapefruit, Cola and Cactus-Lime)
 Seth&Riley's Garage (Hard Lemonade, Hard Ginger)
 Star Cocktails (London G&Tonic, Berlin Colameister, Miami Strawberry Margarita)

Water
 Vichy Classique
 Vichy Fresh (Raspberry-Rhubarb, Aloe Vera-Apricot, Lemon-Lime, Orange-Mango, Apple, Green tea-Pomegranate)
 Vichy Sport
 Vichy Vitamin (Daily, Sport, Reload)
 Värska Originaal

Soft drinks
 Saku Kali
 Lotte Limonaad

Energy drinks
 Battery (Battery, Battery No Calories – Lime)
 Super-Manki

Marketing
Among other marketing activities, Saku Brewery sponsors the following events and organizations:

 BC Tartu, an Estonian professional basketball team
 Estonian Ski Association
 Hard Rock Laager, an Estonian rock music festival
 International Summer Competition for Skiers
 Rabarock, former Estonian rock music festival
 Silverspoon gastronomy award
 Saku Suurhall

See also
 Beer in Estonia

References

External links
 

Beer in Estonia
Food and drink companies of Estonia
1820s establishments in Estonia
Food and drink companies established in 1820
Estonian brands
Beer brands
Saku Parish
Breweries in Estonia